Kostyunino is a rural locality (a village) in Ivanovskoye Rural Settlement, Kovrovsky District, Vladimir Oblast, Russia. The population was 11 as of 2010.

Geography 
Kostyunino is located 37 km southeast of Kovrov (the district's administrative centre) by road. Novoye is the nearest rural locality.

References 

Rural localities in Kovrovsky District